The Busher Stakes is an American Thoroughbred stakes horse race for three-year-old fillies run each February at Aqueduct Race Track in Jamaica, New York and as of 2016 carries a purse of $125,000.

The Busher Handicap is named in honor of champion racing mare Busher, Champion Two Year Old Filly of 1944.

The race was run at 1 mile (8 furlongs in 1978 and 1979 and at a mile and an eighth (9 furlongs) from 1985 to 1992. It was not run in 1986 and 1987.

Records
Speed Record: At one mile and one-sixteenth (1993 to present):
 1:43.21 - It's Tricky (2011)

At one mile and an eighth (1985 to 1992):
 1:50 - Kamikaze Rick (1985)
 1:52 2/5 - I'm A Thriller (1991)
 1:52 3/5 - Queen Of Triumph (1992)

Most wins by an owner:
 2 - Christiana Stables (1978, 1979)

Most wins by a jockey:
 2 - Aaron Gryder (1998, 2004)
 2 - Angel Cordero Jr. (1981, 1985)
 2 - Joe Bravo (1993, 2001)
 2 - Jorge F. Chavez (1992, 1997)
 2 - Norberto Arroyo Jr. (2000, 2005)
 2 - Ruben Hernandez (1978, 1979)

Most wins by a trainer:
 3 - John C. Kimmel (1995, 1997, 2001)

Past Winners

References

Graded stakes races in the United States
Horse races in New York City
Aqueduct Racetrack
Recurring sporting events established in 1978
1978 establishments in New York City